Anthony "Tony" Ianno  (born 1957) is a businessman and a former Canadian politician.  He served as a Liberal Party of Canada MP representing Trinity—Spadina (1993–2006) and Minister of Families and Caregivers (2004–06).

Personal life
Born on January 2, 1957, in Toronto, Ontario, Ianno graduated from the University of Toronto with a Bachelor of Science degree. He and his wife, Christine Innes, have four children. He is also the cousin of former Ontario MPP and cabinet minister Joseph Cordiano.  His wife, Christine, was the Liberal candidate for Trinity-Spadina in the 2008 federal election and 2011 federal election.

Politics
Ianno was a long-time political organizer and helped a number of Italian-Canadians win federal and provincial Liberal nominations in Toronto in the 1980s. He also was a key figure in organizing support among Toronto's large Italian-Canadian population for Jean Chrétien during the 1990 Liberal leadership campaign.

He first ran for Federal office in the 1988 election, as part of a group of four Liberals who, according to author William Johnson, "brought a new turbulence to the politics of Metro Toronto." The group, which included Joe Volpe, Armindo Silva, and Jasbir Singh, worked together and used aggressive tactics to secure nominations in the Toronto area. Ianno was nominated in the Toronto riding of Trinity-Spadina, but was defeated by New Democratic Party incumbent Dan Heap.

He ran again in the 1993 election and was elected in a Liberal sweep where they won nearly every seat in Ontario. Ianno continued to represent Trinity-Spadina for the next 13 years until he was defeated in 2006.

While most Ontario seats were easily won by the Liberals under Prime Minister Jean Chrétien, Trinity—Spadina was closely fought each time. Ianno narrowly held the diverse downtown riding through four federal elections, facing strong competition from New Democratic Party candidates. Much of his support came from the Italian, Portuguese and Chinese areas. Toronto's traditional Little Italy and Chinatown areas are in the riding. Ianno defeated Toronto city councillor Olivia Chow in the 1997 election and The Globe and Mail journalist Michael Valpy who ran for the NDP in the 2000 election. In the 2004 election, Ianno again faced councillor Chow and managed to win re-election, as the Liberals were reduced to a minority government due to the Sponsorship Scandal.

On July 20, 2004, Ianno was appointed to the junior position of Minister of State (Families and Caregivers) in Paul Martin's cabinet following the Liberals' re-election.

During the 2006 election, Ianno faced off against Chow for the third time. This time she narrowly defeated him, winning 46% of the vote to Ianno's 40%. Some attributed Ianno's loss to his perceived support for the Toronto Port Authority and the Toronto City Centre Airport. Although Ianno did not have an official role in the Authority's creation or policies, he nonetheless defended a controversial payout to the Authority as compensation for the cancellation of the Island Airport Bridge.

His party's proposal redress the Head Tax also did not help his campaign, as the Liberals had not consulted many of the major Canadian-Chinese groups (despite claiming to), the promised amount was reduced to from $12.5 million to $2.5 million, and the pre-condition was that the government would make no apology, while the three opposition parties pledged to make a full apology. Several gaffes by the Liberals also reflected negatively on Ianno, including when Mike Klander (the executive vice-president of the federal Liberals' Ontario wing) made posts on his blog comparing Chow to a Chow Chow dog and calling her husband an "asshole". Klander apologized for the remark and resigned.

Later life
After the election, The Globe and Mail reported on February 11, 2006 that Ianno had been "burning up the caucus phone lines" testing the waters for a possible bid in the Liberal leadership campaign to replace Martin. On April 8, 2006, Mr. Ianno told Canadian Press that he decided to run for the party presidency, in which he was unsuccessful.

Electoral record

References

External links

1957 births
Businesspeople from Toronto
Canadian people of Italian descent
Liberal Party of Canada MPs
Living people
Members of the 27th Canadian Ministry
Members of the House of Commons of Canada from Ontario
Members of the King's Privy Council for Canada
Politicians from Toronto
University of Toronto alumni